The 2022–23 Charlton Athletic season is the club's 117th season in their existence, after having been founded in 1905, and their third back in League One following relegation from the Championship in 2020. Along with competing in League One, the club will also participate in the FA Cup, EFL Cup and the EFL Trophy. The season covers the period from 1 July 2022 to 30 June 2023.

Squad statistics

|}

Top scorers

Disciplinary record

Transfers

Transfers in

Transfers out

Loans in

Loans out

Friendlies
On Monday May 30 2022, Charlton announced a pre-season training camp in Spain. On 31 May 2022, Charlton Athletic announced its first confirmed friendlies taking place ahead of the 2021/22 season would be against Swansea City at The Valley. On 6 June 2022, Chartlon confirmed two further friendlies with Dartford and Sutton United. On 22 June 2022, a fourth friendly was announced against Kilmarnock which would take place during the club's Spanish training camp. On 6 July 2022, a fifth friendly was organised against Colchester United. A sixth, behind-closed-doors, friendly against Welling United was announced on Thursday 21 July 2022.

Competitions

League One

League table

Result summary

Results by round

Matches
The 2022–23 season fixtures were released on Thursday 23 June 2022.

FA Cup

The first round draw was made on Monday 17 October 2022. On Friday 21 October 2022, the club confirmed the date of their first round fixture. The second round draw was made on Monday 7 November 2022. On 15 November 2022, the club announced the date for their second round match. The second round replay date was confirmed on Monday 28 November 2022. The third round draw was also made on Monday 28 November 2022, should they progress after their second round replay.

EFL Cup

The first round draw was made on Thursday 23 June 2022. On Tuesday 5 July 2022, the club confirmed the date of their first round fixture. The second round draw was made on Wednesday 10 August 2022. The third round draw was made on Wednesday 24 August 2022. On Monday 12 September 2022, the club confirmed the date of their third round fixture. The fourth round draw was made on Thursday 10 November 2022. On Thursday 24 November 2022, the club confirmed the date of their fourth round fixture. The quarter-finals draw was made on Thursday 22 December 2022. On Tuesday 27 December 2022, the club confirmed the date of their quarter-finals fixture.

EFL Trophy

The regional group stage draw was confirmed on Monday 20 June 2022 and saw Charlton Athletic placed in Southern Group A, alongside Colchester United and Gillingham. On Thursday 23 June 2022, it was confirmed that the final team in the group would be Brighton & Hove Albion U21. On Thursday 7 July 2022, the club announced the dates of their EFL Trophy Southern Group A fixtures. On Friday 11 November 2022, the draw for the second round of the EFL Trophy was made on Sky Sports. On 15 November 2022, the club announced the date for their second round EFL Trophy match.

London Senior Cup

References

Notes

Charlton Athletic
Charlton Athletic F.C. seasons
Charlton
Charlton
English football clubs 2022–23 season